The Order of the Caribbean Community is an award given to 

The award was initiated at the Eighth (8th) Conference of Heads of State and Governments of CARICOM in 1987 and began bestowal in 1992. Decisions as to award are taken by the Advisory Committee for the Order of the Caribbean Community

The Insignia of the O.C.C. set in gold and the Ribbon of the Order are presented to those honoured.

Privileges and entitlements
There are some privileges and entitlements invested upon the recipients. Some of these are as follows:

 The award confers the styling The Honourable upon the recipient and Post-nominals O.C.C.
 Members of the Order are accorded the privilege of free movement among Member States of the Community and are issued with a travel document which is assigned similar status to a diplomatic passport.
 The right to reside in and be gainfully employed in any Member State, as well as the right to acquire and dispose of property, as would citizens of Member States, are entitlements granted to Members of the Order.

Recipients

 William Gilbert Demas, 1992
 Sir Shridath Surendranath Ramphal, 1992
 Sir Derek Alton Walcott, 1992
 Dame Nita Barrow, 1994
 Justice Philip Telford Georges, 1994
 Sir Meredith Alister McIntyre, 1994
 The Rt. Hon. Michael Norman Manley, 1994
 The Rt. Hon. Vere Cornwall Bird, 1998
 Arthur Napoleon Raymond Robinson, 1998
 Sir Philip Manderson Sherlock, 1998
 Sir Garfield Sobers, 1998
 Sir George Alleyne, 2001
 The Rt. Hon. George Cadle Price, 2001
 Slinger Francisco (The Mighty Sparrow), 2001
 Dame Eugenia Charles, 2002
 The Rt. Hon. Sir John Compton, 2002
 Lloyd Best, 2002
 Professor the Honourable Ralston 'Rex' Nettleford, 2008
 The Honourable George Lamming, 2008
 Brian Charles Lara, 2008
 His Excellency Dr. Nicholas Joseph Orville Liverpool, 2008
 Sir Edwin Carrington, KCN, TC, CM 2011
 His Excellency Kamaluddin Mohammed, 2012 
 Professor the Honourable Kevin Dion Cavendish, 2019 
 Sir Viv Richards, 2022 
Dame Billie Miller, 2022 
 Ambassador Irwin LaRocque, 2022

References